Jobun of Silla (r. 230–247, died 247), also known by his title Jobun Isageum, was the eleventh king of the Korean state of Silla.  He was the grandson of Beolhyu Isageum, and a member of the Seok clan.  He was the son of Goljeong with Lady Ongmo, a daughter of Kim Gudo.  Lady Ongmo's brother was Michu Isageum.

The Samguk Sagi also reports that the small country of Gammun-guk (near present-day Gimcheon) was conquered by Jobun's general Uro in 231. Japanese forces attacked the capital but Jobun Isageum wins against the Japanese in 232.  Golbeol-guk (near present-day Yeongcheon) surrendered in 236. Baekje attacked the western frontier of Silla in 239.  Clashes with Goguryeo and Wa took place during Jobun's reign.

Family 

 Grandfather: Beolhyu of Silla (died 196, r. 184–196)
 Grandmther: Unknown Queen
 Father: Seok Goljeong (석골정)
 Mother: Queen Ongmo, of the Park clan (옥모부인 김씨), Gudo Galmunwang (구도 갈문왕)
Spouse:
Queen Aihye, of the Seok Clan (아이혜부인), daughter of Naehae of Silla
Daughter: Queen Myeongwon, of the Seok clan (명원부인 석씨) – married Seok Uro
Daughter: Queen Gwangmyeong (광명부인 석씨), of the Seok Clan – married Michu of Silla
Son: Seok Gul-suk (석걸숙)
Grandson: Girim of Silla, the 15th king of Silla
Concubine: Queen Park, of the Park clan (미소부인 박씨), daughter of Naehae of Silla
Son: Yurye of Silla (r. 284–298, died 298)– the 14th king of Silla

See also
Rulers of Korea
Three Kingdoms of Korea
History of Korea

References

Silla rulers
247 deaths
3rd-century monarchs in Asia
Year of birth unknown
3rd-century Korean people